Isard may refer to:
 Pistol Isard, a Spanish semi-automatic pistol
 Pyrenean chamois or isard
 Andorra national rugby union team or Els Isards
 Isard, an interactive geometry program

People with the surname
 Walter Isard (1919–2010), American economist

Fictional
 Ysanne Isard, a character in the Star Wars franchise

See also 
 Isarn (disambiguation)
 Izard (disambiguation)
 Izzard (disambiguation)